The Guiberson A-1020 is a four-stroke diesel radial engine developed for use in aircraft and tanks.

Design and development
Development of the Guiberson diesel engine started in the 1930s with the A-918 and A-980 which was first flown in 1931. It is a single-row direct drive nine-cylinder four-cycle engine.

Operational history
Production A-1020s and T-1020s were designed and sold by Guiberson and produced by Buda Engine Co.

Variants
Guiberson A-918Rated at  - one of the initial development models for use on aircraft.
Guiberson A-980Rated at  - one of the initial development models for use on aircraft.
Guiberson A-1020Rated at  - production engines for aircraft use.
Guiberson T-1020Rated at  - for use in light tanks such as the M-3 Stuart

Applications
 M3 Stuart light tank - T-1020
 Stinson Reliant  - A-1020
 Waco 10 - A-980

Surviving engines

 There is a T-1020 on display at the New England Air Museum, Bradley International Airport, Windsor Locks, CT.

Specifications (A-1020)

See also

References

Further reading

1940s aircraft piston engines
Aircraft radial diesel engines